Sam See (born 30 September 1993) is a Singaporean stand up comedian and improvisor.

Early life 
Sam had studied primary and secondary at Saint Andrew's School, Singapore in ten years. And had studied video game programming at Temasek Polytechnic, and had been awarded The Integrated Infocomm Scholarship from the Infocomm Media Development Authority in 2010.

Career

Comedy 

In 2012, Sam started performing stand-up comedy in Singapore at an open mic called Talking Cock. He had previously discovered comedy online by Kumar (Singaporean entertainer) and Eddie Izzard while schooling. He had also started to perform publicly as an openly gay man during this time. He has also worked as a showrunner and producer, and was the director of The Comedy Club.

In 2019, See brought his stand-up comedy show Coming Out Loud to the Edinburgh Festival Fringe. In August 2020, he released Coming Out Loud online.

In 2022, See returned to the Edinburgh Festival Fringe with a second show Government Approved Sex. During that same year, See was also one of ten writers long-listed for the 2023 Epigram Books Fiction Prize.

He also performs improv with the troupe The Latecomers.

Television 

In 2016, Sam was a performer on OK Chope!, a weekly live comedy panel show in Singapore where he appeared in all thirty episodes as a panelist and an on-location reporter. The show was cancelled after a joke made by another panelist about Prime Minister of Malaysia Najib Razak.

In 2019, See appeared on Comedy Central Stand-Up, Asia! for its fourth season. He also appeared on The Jim Jefferies Show in an interview segment about Singaporean civil liberties. He also appeared on BBC World Service to discuss performing stand-up in Singapore.

In 2022, See provided the voice for various characters on Channel 5's Puberteens, including Winston, Marco & Benji.

Online streaming 

In 2020, Sam started streaming in March on Facebook and YouTube before moving over to Twitch, under the username 'MrSamSee'. Besides streaming video game content, he also ran a tabletop roleplaying series called Red Dot Wrestling, which featured Singapore Pro Wrestling Champion Da Butcherman, Malaysia Pro Wrestling Champion Cornelius LOW, Jake De Leon, and NXT wrestler Dante Chen.

Filmography

Television

Podcasts

References

External links 

 

Singaporean comedians
1993 births
Living people
Singaporean LGBT people
Gay comedians
Gay actors
Singaporean people of Chinese descent